Marchioness of Milford Haven may refer to:

 Princess Victoria of Hesse and by Rhine (1863–1950), wife of Prince Louis of Battenberg, created Marquess of Milford Haven in 1917.
 Nadejda Mountbatten, Marchioness of Milford Haven (1896–1963), wife of George Mountbatten, 2nd Marquess of Milford Haven.
 Romaine Dahlgren Pierce (1923–1975), first wife of David Mountbatten, 3rd Marquess of Milford Haven between 1950–1954
 Janet Mountbatten, Marchioness of Milford Haven (b. 1937), second wife of David Mountbatten, 3rd Marquess of Milford Haven (m. 1960)
 Sarah Georgina Walker (b. 1961/2), first wife of George Mountbatten, 4th Marquess of Milford Haven between 1989–1996
 Clare Mountbatten, Marchioness of Milford Haven (b. 1960), second wife of George Mountbatten, 4th Marquess of Milford Haven (m. 1997)